Michałówka  is a village in the administrative district of Gmina Dorohusk, within Chełm County, Lublin Voivodeship, in eastern Poland, close to the border with Ukraine.

In 2005 the village had a population of 230.

References

Villages in Chełm County